Earl Morse Wilbur (Jericho, Vermont, April 26, 1866 – Berkeley, California, January 8, 1956) was an American Unitarian minister, educator, and historian of Unitarianism.

Wilbur was the first dean 1904-1910; then president 1911-1931; and until 1934, professor of homiletics and practical theology at the Pacific Unitarian School for Ministry, Berkeley, California of the American Unitarian Association (AUA). His writings focused on the development of Unitarianism within European Christianity.

He graduated from University of Vermont and Harvard Divinity School.

Works

References

External links
 The papers of Earl Morse Wilbur are in the Harvard Divinity School Library at Harvard Divinity School in Cambridge, Massachusetts.

1866 births
1956 deaths
19th-century American educators
19th-century Unitarian clergy
20th-century American educators
20th-century Unitarian clergy
American Unitarian clergy
American Unitarians
Harvard Divinity School alumni
Historians of Christianity
People from Jericho, Vermont
University of Vermont alumni